Cask strength (also known as barrel proof/barrel strength) is a term used by whiskey (often spelled "whisky" outside of Ireland and the United States) and rum producers to describe a whiskey or rum that has not been substantially diluted after its storage in a cask for maturation. The level of alcohol-by-volume (ABV) strength for a cask strength whiskey or rum is typically in the range of 52–66% ABV.

Most bottled whiskey and rum is diluted with water to reduce its strength (i.e., ABV level) to a level that makes it less expensive to produce and more palatable to most consumers – usually about 40% ABV, which is the statutory minimum in some countries, including the United States. The degree of dilution significantly affects the flavor and general drinking experience of the whiskey or rum.

Production 

Cask strength is not the highest proof for a whiskey. Still-strength whiskey is typically a higher proof. Whiskey produced by a pot still increases in strength with each distillation and is typically distilled to about 70% ABV, and column stills are capable of producing much higher proof levels. Most distillers reduce the proof by adding water to the whiskey prior to casking it.

The proof level tends to change somewhat during the aging process, depending on storage conditions. Scotch whisky is typically aged in used barrels, and due to the relatively cool climate in Scotland, the proof level typically stays the same or goes down during maturation. In contrast, American bourbon whiskey is produced using new barrels. Storage conditions in Kentucky and Tennessee, where nearly all of it is produced, allow the proof levels to rise during aging.

The vast majority of whiskey bottled has been watered down to about 40–46% ABV, although some whiskies marketed for whiskey enthusiasts are bottled at proof levels all the way up to cask strength.

In the United States, the use of various terms, including "barrel proof", on product labels is regulated by truth in labeling requirements. Under ruling 79-9 of the U.S. Bureau of Alcohol, Tobacco and Firearms, a whiskey can only be called "barrel proof" if the bottling proof is not more than 1% ABV (2 degrees U.S. proof) lower than when the barrels were dumped at the end of the aging period. The ruling also covers the use of several other phrases describing high-proof whiskies. The phrases "original proof", "original barrel proof", and "entry proof" are restricted to "indicate that the proof of the spirits entered into the barrel and the proof of the bottled spirits are the same".

Drinking

The flavor profile and "heat" – the burning sensation caused by ethanol – of a given whiskey change as it is diluted, and cask strength whiskies allow consumers control over this dilution process, allowing them to add water or ice according to their tastes. Aficionados even suggest using mineral water rather than ordinary tap water, and some even distinguish among different mineral water selections.

There are bourbons that are designed to drink at cask strength using wider grain oak staves as opposed to the more expensive narrower grain staves. These bourbons do not do well when cut down with water and are designed to be drank at cask strength.

See also
 Outline of whisky

References

Additional sources
Directive 87/250/EEC, 15 March 1987.

External links 
 A Glossary Page Of Whiskey Terms
 Short explanation of what is meant by cask strength whiskey

 
Whisky